Salvadori's teal (Salvadorina waigiuensis) or Salvadori's duck, is a species of bird endemic to New Guinea. It is placed in the monotypic genus Salvadorina.

It has a dark brown head and neck, and its body is barred and spotted dark brown and off white, with orange legs and a yellow bill.

It is a secretive inhabitant of fast-flowing highland streams and lakes. It is an omnivore. It locates its nest near water, and lays 2 to 4 eggs in the dry season. The IUCN has listed the bird as least concern, and the total population may be slowly declining.

Taxonomy
When Walter Rothschild and Ernst Hartert first described Salvadori's teal in 1894, they placed it in the concurrently created monotypic genus Salvadorina. It has no subspecies. Initially, it was generally placed with South America's torrent duck and New Zealand's blue duck — two species of similar ecological niches — in a tribe called Merganettini. In the 1940s, Ernst Mayr moved the species to the dabbling duck genus Anas, based on several anatomical features. It was then reinstated in its own genus and moved to the shelduck subfamily Tadorninae, which also contains the torrent duck and blue duck which convergently have evolved adaptations to mountain stream habitat. All or some of these species may actually be surviving lineages of an ancient Gondwanan radiation of waterfowl (Sraml et al. 1996).

The duck's common and genus names both commemorate 18th-century Italian ornithologist Tommaso Salvadori. The species name waigiuensis refers to Waigeo (also known as Waigiu), an island near New Guinea.

Description
The sexes are similar in plumage, with males averaging slightly larger than females.

Range and habitat
Salvadori's teal is endemic to New Guinea; although the type specimen was reportedly collected on the Indonesian island of Waigeo, there is some doubt over the veracity of that claim, as the species is not now found there.

Behavior

Food and feeding
Salvadori's teal is an omnivore, and feeds by both dabbling and diving. It eats plants and insects, and possibly small fish.

Breeding
It locates its nest near water, and lays 2 to 4 eggs in the dry season.

Conservation and threats
The International Union for Conservation of Nature (IUCN) has listed Salvadori's teal as least concern. The total world population, currently estimated to be between 2,500 and 9,999 mature individuals, is thought to be declining at a moderate rate. Hunting, habitat degradation and predation by dogs are among the threats this species faces, and competition with introduced sport fish may also cause problems.

References 

Beehler, Bruce M., Pratt, Thane K. & Zimmerman, Dale A. (1986): Birds of New Guinea. Princeton University Press, New Jersey. 

Sraml, M.; Christidis, L.; Easteal, S.; Horn, P. & Collet, C. (1996): Molecular Relationships Within Australasian Waterfowl (Anseriformes). Australian Journal of Zoology 44(1): 47–58.  (HTML abstract)

Salvadori's teal
Birds of New Guinea
Salvadori's teal
Endemic fauna of New Guinea